The Captain George Conrad Flavel House is a house built in 1901 in Astoria, Oregon.  It was listed on the National Register of Historic Places in 1986.

History
The house was built by  Joseph W. Suprenant, but the identity of the architect is unknown. The Colonial Revival-style house was the second residence of Captain George Conrad Flavel (1855–1923), his wife Winona and their son Harry, after they moved to it in 1901 from their first home, an 1879-built, smaller and more plain house that is also listed on the National Register, as the George C. and Winona Flavel House. George Conrad Flavel was the son of George Flavel (1824–1893), also a captain.  George Conrad Flavel lived in the house until his death in 1923, and Winona Callendar Flavel (1861–1944) continued to reside there until her death in 1944.  Harry M. Flavel (1886–1951 or 1886–1957) lived in this house as a child and then again from 1924 – after inheriting it from his father – until his death (in 1951 or 1957).

After Harry Flavel's death, his wife, Florence (née Sherman) and their two children, Mary Louise and Harry S., were the only residents of the house. In 1947, Harry S., at age 20, attacked a neighbor with a hatchet, and the family became known as recluses in the community after the incident. In 1983, Harry S. was imprisoned after hitting a man's car with a chain one evening and then stabbing him. After serving seven years of his sentence, Harry S. was released from prison in 1990, and the Flavel family disappeared from the house shortly after. The home remained uninhabited and derelict for over twenty years until the city of Astoria took control of the property, acting under a derelict-buildings ordinance passed in 2011. The city then proceeded to board-up the house and carry out an inspection. Foreclosure proceedings followed in late 2013.

The house was sold in May 2015 to local Astoria businessman Greg Newenhof.  Mr. Newenhof said that he plans to restore the house in order to move in and live at the property as his residence.  When asked how long the restoration might take he replied, "Probably the rest of my life." Unfortunately Mr. Newenhof passed unexpectedly in Astoria January 28, 2018. It is unknown if his heirs will continue with the restoration.

See also
Capt. George Flavel House and Carriage House, 441 Eighth Street, Astoria, a house museum, also NRHP-listed
George C. and Winona Flavel House, 818 Grand Ave., Astoria, also NRHP-listed

References

External links 
 RaiseTheStakesEditions.com - History of the Captain George Conrad Flavel Home

Queen Anne architecture in Oregon
Houses completed in 1901
Colonial Revival architecture in Oregon
Houses on the National Register of Historic Places in Astoria, Oregon
1901 establishments in Oregon
Historic district contributing properties in Oregon